Mark Clarke (1 October 1950 – 22 October 2013) was a Caymanian sailor. He competed at the 1992 Summer Olympics and the 1996 Summer Olympics. In 2013, Clarke went missing off the Cayman Islands in his boat, and his body was never found.

References

External links
 

1950 births
2013 deaths
Caymanian male sailors (sport)
Olympic sailors of the Cayman Islands
Sailors at the 1992 Summer Olympics – Finn
Sailors at the 1996 Summer Olympics – Finn
Place of birth missing